Manfred "Manni" Reichert (28 October 1940, Königsberg, East Prussia – 10 April 2010, Remscheid) was a German football defender. He played for Wuppertaler SV.

References

External links
 

1940 births
2010 deaths
German footballers
Bundesliga players
Wuppertaler SV players
Association football defenders
Sportspeople from Königsberg
West German footballers
People from Remscheid
Sportspeople from Düsseldorf (region)
Footballers from North Rhine-Westphalia